Herndon Historic District is a national historic district located at Herndon, Fairfax County, Virginia.  It encompasses 173 contributing buildings, 1 contributing site, and 1 contributing structure in the central business district and surrounding residential areas of Herndon.  They include 104 houses, 20 commercial buildings, 6 institutional buildings, 4 industrial buildings, 30 garages, 8 barns, the pumphouse, the gas generating building, the water tower and the town square. Most of the buildings were constructed between 1890 and 1920.  Notable buildings include the Town Hall (1939), Nachmans Department Store, National Bank of Herndon (1910), 5 and Dime Cafe (1920s), Sanitary Grocery Store, Loudoun Hall or
the Paine House, Benjamin Detweiler House (1890), and the Bicksler House. Located in the district is the separately listed Herndon Depot.

It was listed on the National Register of Historic Places in 1991.

References

Historic districts in Fairfax County, Virginia
Victorian architecture in Virginia
National Register of Historic Places in Fairfax County, Virginia
Historic districts on the National Register of Historic Places in Virginia